The R707 road is a regional road in County Tipperary, Ireland. It travels from the N24 road west of Clonmel, through the town, rejoining the N24 east of the town.

References

Regional roads in the Republic of Ireland
Roads in County Tipperary